Statistics of Guam League for the 2007–08 season.

League standings

References
Guam 2007/08 (RSSSF)

Guam Soccer League seasons
Guam
Mens